Chumak was a merchant / carter of Ukrainian history and folklore

Chumak may also refer to:

Chumak (surname)
Chumak (company), a food processor in Kakhovka, Ukraine
Chumak (dance), a Ukrainian folk dance
Jumak, another Romanization referring to a type of tavern in old Korean society

See also
Chumakov (disambiguation)